Treika Blé (born 26 February 1992) is an Ivorian footballer who plays as a midfielder.

International career

International goals
Scores and results list Ivory Coast's goal tally first.

References

External links 
 

1992 births
Living people
Ivorian footballers
Ivory Coast international footballers
Association football midfielders
2016 African Nations Championship players
Ivory Coast A' international footballers